Modoc Point is an unincorporated community in Klamath County, Oregon, United States on U.S. Route 97 on the shore of Upper Klamath Lake.

The post office takes its name from Modoc Point, a prominent point on Upper Klamath Lake just south of the community.

Modoc Point post office was established in 1916. Earlier, in 1911, the Southern Pacific Railroad established a station named "Lelu" at this point, and the name was changed to Modoc Point in 1916 to match the post office. Chief Lelu was one of the signatories of the Treaty with the Klamath, etc. on October 14, 1864. "Lelu" was a corruption of the French le loup for "gray wolf".

References

Unincorporated communities in Klamath County, Oregon
Modoc tribe
1916 establishments in Oregon
Unincorporated communities in Oregon